Minuscule 512 (in the Gregory-Aland numbering), ε 441 (in the Soden numbering), is a Greek minuscule manuscript of the New Testament, on parchment. Palaeographically it has been assigned to the 14th century. 
Scrivener labelled it by number 498. The manuscript has complex contents. It was adapted for liturgical use.

Description 

The codex contains the complete text of the four Gospels on 210 parchment leaves (size ). It is written in one column per page, 24 lines per page.

Text 

The Greek text of the codex is a representative of the Byzantine text-type. Hermann von Soden included it to the textual family Kx. Aland placed it in Category V.
According to the Claremont Profile Method it belongs to the Kr in Luke 1 and Luke 20. In Luke 10 no profile was made.

It lacks the text of Luke 22:43-44.

History 

The manuscript was written by Gregorius. Formerly it belonged to the monastery of Nicholas του καλοχωριου. In 1724 it belonged to presbyter Nicholas. The manuscript came to England about 1731 and was presented to archbishop of Canterbury, William Wake, together with minuscules 73, 74, 506-520. Wake presented it to the Christ Church College in Oxford.

The manuscript was added to the list of New Testament minuscule manuscripts by F. H. A. Scrivener (498) and C. R. Gregory (512). Gregory saw it in 1883.

It is currently housed at the Christ Church (Wake 28) in Oxford.

See also 

 List of New Testament minuscules
 Biblical manuscript
 Textual criticism

References

Further reading

External links 

Greek New Testament minuscules
14th-century biblical manuscripts